Frederick Stocks is the name of two English first-class cricketers, who were father and son:

 Frederick Stocks senior (1883–1954), played fleetingly for Northamptonshire
 Frederick Stocks junior (1918–1996), had a much long career for Nottinghamshire